The Astoria Victory Monument, also known as the Doughboy Monument or Soldiers' Monument, is a monument located in Astoria, Oregon, in the United States. It is listed on the National Register of Historic Places. The concrete, Spanish Revival monument designed by Charles T. Diamond was constructed in 1926, incorporating a cast of a sculpture by John Paulding. The structure was recognized individually by the National Register of Historic Places in 1984 and as part of the Uniontown–Alameda Historic District in 1988.

History
The National Register of Historic Places recognized the monument individually on November 15, 1984, and later included the structure as part of the Uniontown–Alameda Historic District on August 25, 1988.

In the mid-2000s, the monument received a $10,000 grant from the State Historic Preservation Office to repair lights and windows, replace doors, renovate the restroom facilities and install new plumbing and toilet fixtures.

See also
 1926 in art
 National Register of Historic Places listings in Clatsop County, Oregon
 Over the Top to Victory (1924), Salem, Oregon

References

External links

 , Clatsop County Historical Society

1926 establishments in Oregon
1926 sculptures
Concrete sculptures in Oregon
Military monuments and memorials in the United States
Monuments and memorials on the National Register of Historic Places in Oregon
National Register of Historic Places in Astoria, Oregon
Outdoor sculptures in Astoria, Oregon
Sculptures of men in Oregon
Spanish Revival architecture in the United States